American singer-songwriter Diana Gordon has released one studio album, five extended plays, seventeen singles, six promotional singles, nineteen music videos and thirteen other appearances. She began as a writer for other artists, later signing with Atlantic Records where she began working on an album while continuing to write songs for other acts and providing vocals on songs. She released her debut single, "Dirty Talk", on February 17, 2010. It achieved success worldwide, reaching number one on the Australian ARIA Singles Chart and the US Dance Club Songs chart. Her debut album With the Music I Die was released in 2011, and although not managing to chart worldwide, it reached number 25 on the Australian ARIA Albums Chart, and produced three further singles.

In 2012, although still signed to Atlantic Records, Gordon decide to self-release a collection of EPs. The lead single from the first EP, "Stimela", was released on June 20, 2012. The first EP, Human Condition: Doleo was released on July 9, 2012. The second EP, Human Condition: Sanguine, was released on January 15, 2013.

In early 2014, Gordon formed a five-piece band called The Righteous Young, of which she is the lead singer. However, Gordon clarified in a Q&A on Facebook that The Righteous young does not mean the end of Wynter Gordon as an act, but is rather an extension of her own music. She released her first single with The Righteous Young, "Everything Burns", on June 3, 2014. The music video, directed by Harrison Boyce, was exclusively released on Idolator and Vevo on the same day.

On July 22, 2016, Gordon announced that she was no longer using the stage name Wynter Gordon. Instead, she will be going by her birth name, Diana. On July 25 Diana Gordon shared her first single under her own name, "The Legend Of".

Albums

Studio albums

Extended plays

Singles

As lead artist

As featured artist

Promotional singles

Other appearances

Writing credits
The following songs have been written by Wynter Gordon, but do not include her as a lead or featured vocal artist.

Music videos

References

Discographies of American artists
Pop music discographies
Electronic music discographies
Rhythm and blues discographies